Avraham Levenbraun (24 June 1916 – 25 August 1987) was an Israeli politician who served as a member of the Knesset for Rakah and Hadash in two spells between 1972 and 1981.

Biography
Born in Ștefănești in Romania, Levenbraun was a member of Hashomer Hatzair during his youth. He made aliyah to Mandatory Palestine in 1938 and joined kibbutz Ruhama, where he lived until 1944 when he left due to ideological differences. He moved to Migdal and then Haifa, where he worked as a crane operator at a chemical and fertiliser factory. He became a member of the workers' board, and later its secretary.

In 1954 he joined Maki, having previously been a Mapam member, and was part of the group that split to form Rakah in 1965. He was on the party's list for the 1969 elections, and although he failed to win a seat, he entered the Knesset on 16 February 1972 as a replacement for Emile Habibi. He was re-elected in 1973, but lost his seat in the 1977 elections. He briefly returned to the Knesset in February 1981 as a replacement for the deceased Hanna Mwais, but lost his seat in the June 1981 elections. He remained a member of the Rakah central committee until 1985, and was also a member of the Histadrut's executive committee.

He died in 1987.

References

External links

1916 births
1987 deaths
People from Ștefănești, Botoșani
Jews in Mandatory Palestine
Jewish socialists
Israeli communists
Israeli trade unionists
Maki (political party) politicians
Mapam politicians
Hadash politicians
Members of the 7th Knesset (1969–1974)
Members of the 8th Knesset (1974–1977)
Members of the 9th Knesset (1977–1981)
Romanian emigrants to Mandatory Palestine
Romanian Jews